Sociedad Anónima de Vehículos Automoviles (SAVA) was a Spanish producer of light and medium commercial vehicles, based in Valladolid.

History
The company started in 1957 with a 3-wheeled vehicle called the SAVA P-54,that could carry 2000 kg loads, but soon switched to make a Barreiros engined light truck. However, by 1960 they built heavier models based on several British-designed Austin, Morris and BMC commercial vehicle series all of these with Spanish built cabs until 1963. They were built and marketed as SAVA, Sava-Austin, or Sava-BMC and gave way to the successful SAVA S-76 model a large van, including the well-known BMC 'FG' range.

For a short while Sava also assembled the heavy French Berliet GPS-12, sold as Sava-Berliet.

In early 60s Sava were making steelcabs of their own design, and from then on only the Sava badge was used. Soon the lorry range appeared starting with the SAVA WF-3 a bonneted model that was based on earlier designs of British original models. Another SAVA that existed was the SAVA FF diesel FC (forward control) a 5 Ton lorry and an improved SAVA FG 7 Ton truck model was launched all of which were based on old BMC models and were mostly identical to those made in the UK before.

In 1965 Enasa, the maker of Pegaso trucks, took over SAVA, but the Sava brand subsisted until 1969, when all the range was rebadged as Pegaso. Until the 1980s these were renamed and produced as the well-known PEGASO SAVA J4-1100 range of vans and there was also the popular SAVA FC light trucks, coaches, minibuses and panel vans all of these were 6 Ton models, they were sometimes also badged as SAVA-PEGASO.

Production of these SAVA vans ended in the late 1980s when the ENASA company was acquired in the 1990s. Several PEGASO SAVA J4 and FC models can still be found and being driven in most parts of Spain due to its cheap running and plenty of spares are available.

Sava trucks were used by the Spanish Armed Police in their anti-riot operations.

References

External links

Truck manufacturers of Spain
Defunct motor vehicle manufacturers of Spain